Video Gaming Technologies is an American supplier of gambling machines.

VGT was founded in 1991 in Franklin, Tennessee by Jon Yarbrough.

VGT was privately owned, until it was bought in October 2014 by the Australian company Aristocrat Leisure for about US$1.3 billion, increasing its gambling machines in North America from 8,200 to 28,400. VGT develops casino games for Class II gaming markets in the U.S.

References

External links

Companies based in Franklin, Tennessee
Manufacturing companies established in 1991
Gambling companies of the United States
Manufacturing companies based in Tennessee
Slot machine manufacturers
1991 establishments in Tennessee